Sigmund F. "Ziggy" Andrusking (January 18, 1913 – August 18, 1994) was an American football guard who played one season with the Brooklyn Dodgers of the National Football League. He played college football at the University of Detroit Mercy and attended East High School in Erie, Pennsylvania.

References

External links
Just Sports Stats

1913 births
1994 deaths
Players of American football from Pennsylvania
American football guards
Detroit Titans football players
Brooklyn Dodgers (NFL) players
Sportspeople from Erie, Pennsylvania
Wilmington Clippers players